The William Goodale House, also known as the University of Wyoming Alumni House, is a Tudor Revival style residence built in 1931 for William and Ethel Goodale in Laramie, Wyoming. The house was designed by Wyoming architects William DuBois and F.W. Ambrose.

Ethel Miller Goodale was a sister of Leslie A. Miller, Wyoming governor from 1933 to 1939. Her father A.E. Miller had been mayor of Laramie. William Goodale owned a Hudson automobile dealership and was involved in the First State Bank of Laramie. The Goodales lived in the house until 1942, when Mr. and Mrs. George Forbes bought the house. The surrounding neighborhood became more commercial over time and many of the neighboring houses were torn down. In 1990 the University of Wyoming Alumni Association bought the house for its headquarters.

The two-story house was constructed by the Speigelberg Lumber Company of Wyoming sandstone with brick decorative accents with a sandstone wall partially surrounding the property. The roof is covered by terra-cotta tiles. Windows include leaded panels and opal glass in a variety of configurations. Masonry is rustic and the roof tiles wrap over the eaves. The brick accents in the attic gables resemble half-timbering.

The William Goodale House was placed on the National Register of Historic Places on August 5, 1991.

References

External links

 William Goodale House at the Wyoming State Historic Preservation Office

National Register of Historic Places in Albany County, Wyoming
Tudor Revival architecture in the United States
University of Wyoming
Houses completed in 1931